Lords of Middle-earth, Volume I is a 1986 fantasy role-playing game supplement published by Iron Crown Enterprises for Middle-earth Role Playing.

Contents
Lords of Middle-earth, Volume I is the first of three supplements that was intended to detail all the characters in the history of Middle-earth.

Reception
Graham Staplehurst reviewed Lords of Middle-earth, Volume I: The Immortals for White Dwarf #87, and stated that "There is no doubt that this book is very useful. It will be less use if you've already got a lot of the MERP packages, since the Valar and Maiar are unlikely to make many appearances, but for those who are interested in Tolkien's world and are running (or want to run) a campaign there, LOME is excellent source material."

J. Michael Caparula reviewed Lords of Middle-earth, Volume I in Space Gamer/Fantasy Gamer No. 79. Caparula commented that "This format and amount of information here is terrific, but I'm anxious to see it applied to more down to earth types. I'd rather see my players encounter Faramir or Fatty Bolger than the likes of Ungoliant."

Reviews
Adventurer (Issue 7 - Feb 1987)
Dragon #127

References

Middle-earth Role Playing supplements
Role-playing game supplements introduced in 1986